Beatles Stories: A Fab Four Fan's Ultimate Road Trip is a 2011 film.

Synopsis
Songwriter Seth Swirsky grew up in the 1960s, a fan of The Beatles. As he got older he noticed that whenever someone told a story about themselves and his favorite band he was all ears.

So he bought a video camera and set out on an 8-year journey to film personal stories about his heroes from those who had one.

Interviewees
Some of the more than 110 individuals that Swirsky interviewed for the film are former personal assistant Fred Seaman, Sir Ben Kingsley, Graham Nash, Art Garfunkel, Justin Hayward of The Moody Blues, actor Jon Voight, Susanna Hoffs, former first daughter Luci Baines Johnson, former New York Yankee Bernie Williams, Rick Nielsen of Cheap Trick, Brian Wilson of The Beach Boys, actor Henry Winkler, Indianapolis Colts football owner Jim Irsay, Smokey Robinson, Donovan, Beatles longtime producer Sir George Martin, Lennon ex-girlfriend May Pang, Beatles engineers Norman Smith, Ken Scott and John Kurlander and American cultural icons Frank Gifford and Bob Eubanks, among others.

Premieres
Beatles Stories was chosen as an Official Selection at the 2011 European Independent Film Festival—considered the Sundance of Europe—and had its world premiere in Paris, France, on April 3, 2011. It was an Official Selection at The 2011 Newport Beach International Film Festival, where it made its North American premiere on April 29, 2011. It made its East Coast premiere at The Gold Coast International Film Festival on June 2, 2011.

It was also an official selection at The 2011 Las Vegas Film Festival, Santa Fe Independent Film Festival, Bend Film Festival, Kansas International Film Festival and the 2012 Fargo Film Festival. The documentary consists of filmed interviews that he conducted with people who had a personal story or recollection about themselves and one or all of The "Fab Four".

In June 2012, it was screened in London, Manchester and Liverpool.

DVD release
The DVD of the documentary as well as a bonus disc containing an additional 25 interviews was released on June 6, 2012. The DVD also contains a director's commentary track and a featurette with Norman "Hurricane" Smith, the engineer who worked on many of the Beatles' songs.

The movie will have its official release in October 2012, to coincide with the 50th anniversary of The Beatles first recording, "Love Me Do".

Criticism
Beatles Stories made news when it was revealed by John Lennon's former personal assistant—one of the over 50 interviewees in the movie—that, by the time of his death, Lennon would have voted for Ronald Reagan in the 1980 elections and, that by the end of his life, he was embarrassed by the naivete of his song "Imagine".

Honors and awards
Beatles Stories was nominated for Best Score for an Indie Film or Documentary at the 2013 Hollywood Music and Media Awards.

References

External links
 

 'Beatles Stories' showcases endless reach of Fab Four's magic
 Beatles Stories: A Fab Four Fan’s Ultimate Road Trip
 Beatles Stories DVD – Seth Swirsky – Review
 Songwriter Seth Swirsky on his new documentary Beatles Stories which was inspired by a visit to Liverpool

2011 films
2011 documentary films
American documentary films
Documentary films about the Beatles
2010s English-language films
2010s American films